429 was a year of the Julian calendar.

429 may also refer to:

 ARINC 429, an avionics databus
 Bell 429 GlobalRanger, a helicopter
 Building 429, a Christian band
 429 Records, a record label
 429 Too Many Requests, an HTTP Status code